Aknashen (also Romanized as Aknachen; until 1978, Khatunarkh Verin, Verin Khatunarkh, and Khatunarkh, also Russified as Verkhniy Khatunarkh) is a town in the Armavir Province of Armenia. The town's church is dedicated to Saint Bartholomew; nearby is a ruin of an 8th-century building.

Archaeology
Evidence from charred remains and crop processing residues in pisé from the Neolithic settlements of Aratashen and Aknashen. Recently, an 8000-year old settlement was excavated at Aknashen

See also 
Armavir Province

References 

 
 World Gazetteer: Armenia – World-Gazetteer.com
 
 
 

Populated places in Armavir Province
Yazidi populated places in Armenia